The Pargor Subdistrict, traditionally known as the Barkhor, is an area of narrow streets and a public square located around Jokhang Temple in Lhasa, Tibet, China.

The Barkhor is a popular devotional circumambulation for pilgrims and locals. The walk is about a kilometre long and encircles the entire Jokhang Temple, the former seat of the State Oracle in Lhasa called the Muru Nyingba Monastery, and a number of former nobles' houses including Tromzikhang and Jamkhang. There are four large incense burners (sangkangs) in the four cardinal directions, with incense burning constantly, to please the gods protecting the Jokhang. The Tromzikhang market is busy in the Barkhor, and the area is a major tourist attraction.

Because the Jokhang Temple has been a symbolic centre of Tibetan protests since 1987, the Barkhor has also seen many demonstrations. When the 14th Dalai Lama won the Nobel Peace Prize in 1989, many of his supporters threw tsampa around the Barkhor to celebrate. After the central government denounced the prize, residents who continued such demonstrations were arrested. The square was briefly closed by riot police during the 2008 Lhasa protests.

References 

Chengguan District, Lhasa
Populated places in Lhasa
History of Lhasa
Subdistricts of the People's Republic of China
Township-level divisions of Tibet